Jamīla bint Thābit, originally named ʿĀṣiya, was a wife of Umar and a female companion of Muhammad.

Biography
She was the daughter of Thabit ibn Abi al-Aflah and Al-Shamus bint Abi Amir, who were both from the 'Amr ibn Awf clan of the Aws tribe in Medina. Her brother Asim was among those who fought at Badr.

Jamila was one of Medina's first converts to Islam. She her mother were among the first ten women to pledge allegiance to Muhammad in 622 CE. On hearing that her name was Asiya ("disobedient"), Muhammad renamed her: "No, you are Jamila" ("beautiful").

She married Umar about five years later, between May 627 and May 628. They had one son, Asim. However, they later divorced. On one occasion, Jamila asked Umar for money, and, as he afterwards reported to Muhammad: 

Jamila and Asim returned to her family in the suburb of Quba. One day Umar arrived in Quba and saw Asim playing in the mosque courtyard. He picked him up and placed him on his mount. Jamila's mother Al-Shamus saw that Umar was taking her grandson away and came up to protest. They could not agree who should have custody of Asim and so they brought their dispute before Abu Bakr. When Abu Bakr ruled, "Do not interfere between a child and its mother," Umar dropped his case and allowed Jamila to keep her son.

Later Jamila was married to Yazid ibn Jariya, and they had one son, Abd al-Rahman.

References

Women companions of the Prophet